Ceratina strenua, the nimble ceratina, is a species of small carpenter bee in the family Apidae. It is found in North America.

References

Further reading

 Arnett, Ross H. (2000). American Insects: A Handbook of the Insects of America North of Mexico. CRC Press.

External links

 NCBI Taxonomy Browser, Ceratina strenua

strenua
Insects described in 1879